ICY was a vocal trio consisting of Pálmi Gunnarsson, Helga Möller and Eiríkur Hauksson. They were the first Icelandic entrants to the Eurovision Song Contest, appearing at the 1986 final in Bergen. Their entry, "Gleðibankinn" (English translation: Bank of Fun), placed 16th.

Eiríkur Hauksson went on to represent Norway in 1991 as part of the group Just 4 Fun and Iceland again as a solo performer in 2007. Both Pálmi Gunnarson and Helga Möller made further appearances in the Icelandic national finals (Helga notably in 1992 with two offerings in partnership with Karl Örvarsson) but did not win.

References 

Eurovision Song Contest entrants for Iceland
Eurovision Song Contest entrants of 1986
Icelandic pop music groups